Tengku Mohd Adam bin Tengku Mohd Rosly (born 19 August 1983) is a Malaysian footballer who currently plays for Perlis FA. He was also part of the Malaysia U-23 squad in 2004.

He started his career by playing with Terengganu. He later joined Pahang in 2005, but had only a role as a substitute. He then transferred to Shahzan Muda FC and earned a spot in the first eleven. He later joined PKNS FC in the 2006/07 season.

References

Living people
Malaysian footballers
1983 births
PKNS F.C. players
People from Terengganu
Malaysian people of Malay descent
Association football forwards
Association football midfielders